Me Vasantrao is a 2022 Indian Marathi-language biographical film based on the life of the Indian classical musician Vasantrao Deshpande. The film is written by Nipun Dharmadhikari, Upendra Sidhaye and directed by Nipun Dharmadhikari. The film stars Rahul Deshpande, Vasantrao Deshpande's grandson, in the lead role. Me Vasantrao became the part of the eligibility list for the prestigious Academy Awards on 10 January 2023, which was a rare feat for Marathi cinema. The music of the film was released globally on 8 March 2022 under the music label OnClick Music which is a flagship music label of Movietone Digital Entertainment Pvt Ltd.

Cast 

 Rahul Deshpande as Vasantrao Deshpande
 Anita Date-Kelkar as Vasantrao's Mother
 Pushkaraj Chirputkar as Purushottam Laxman Deshpande
 Kaumudi Walokar 
 Amey Wagh as Deenanath Mangeshkar
 Sarang Sathaye
 Alok Rajwade as Mama

Music
Music for this film is composed by Rahul Deshpande.

Premise 
The biographical film is based and portrays the story of Vasantrao Deshpande an Indian classical musician. He was known for his contribution towards Natya Sangeet.

Reception

Critical reception 
Kalpeshraj Kubal of The Times of India gave the film 4.5 out of five stars saying, "An unmissable journey of a legend".

Awards 
Rahul Deshpande won the National Award for Best Playback Singer in 2022.

Me Vasantrao also won the National Award for Best Audiography (Sound Designer) for Anmol Bhave.

References

External links 

2022 films
2020s Marathi-language films
Indian biographical films